Keçili (also, Kechili and Ketschily, known as Plankənd until 1994) is a village and municipality in the Shamkir Rayon of Azerbaijan.  It has a population of 5,704.  The municipality consists of the villages of Keçili and Xuluf.

Notes

References 

Populated places in Shamkir District